Station Casinos, LLC is an American hotel and casino company based in Las Vegas suburb of Summerlin South, Nevada, and founded by Frank Fertitta Jr. Station Casinos, along with Affinity Gaming, Boyd Gaming and Golden Entertainment, dominate the locals casino market in Las Vegas. The company purchased several sites that were gaming-entitled, meaning that major casinos can be built at that location without additional approvals. There are only a limited number of such sites available in the Las Vegas area. Station Casinos has also branched out into managing casinos that they do not own. Red Rock Resorts, Inc. is a publicly traded holding company that owns a portion of Station Casinos.

History
The company started out as a locals casino operator on July 1, 1976, founded by Frank Fertitta Jr. Its first casino was the Bingo Palace, which was later renamed Palace Station.

In 2005, there were plans to develop 2 casinos in Reno: Station Casino Reno and Mount Rose Station. In 2020, the land was sold.

On December 4, 2006, Fertitta's sons, Frank Fertitta III and Lorenzo Fertitta, and Colony Capital LLC, operating as Fertitta Colony Partners, made a highly leveraged offer to purchase all existing shares at $82 per share and take the company private. The Fertitta brothers, their sister Delise Sartini, and Blake L. Sartini, her husband, with a combined investment of $870.1 million, purchased a 25% stake in Fertitta Colony Partners. Colony Capital contributed $2.6 billion for a 75% share.

On July 28, 2009, Station Casinos filed for Chapter 11 bankruptcy. Station Casinos' filing listed $5.7 billion in assets against $6.5 billion in debt. The filing said the company had 510 holders of unsecured and subordinate debt totaling $4.4 billion.

Station Casinos exited bankruptcy on June 17, 2011, with $4 billion less in debt and with creditors putting the company's 18 casinos back in the hands of the Fertitta family and their partners. The Fertitta brothers agreed to put nearly $200 million in the reassembled company and now own 45 percent of its shares. The other new equity owners include the company's main lenders, Deutsche Bank AG, which holds 25 percent; JPMorgan Chase with a 15 percent stake; and former bondholders with an additional 15 percent, according to lawyers on the deal.

Station Casinos announced on October 13, 2015, that it would return to the stock market with an initial public offering. On April 26, 2016, Red Rock Resorts, Inc., a new holding company owning a portion of Station Casinos, went public on the NASDAQ Stock Exchange.

In 2016, Station Casinos purchased the Palms Casino Resort for $313 million. The company then spent more than $600 million on renovations, which failed to restore the resort to its former prominence. The Palms was sold to the San Manuel Band of Mission Indians in 2021, for $650 million. That year, the company announced that it would proceed with Durango, a long-planned resort in the southwest Las Vegas Valley. Completion is expected by the end of 2023.

Several casino properties in the Las Vegas Valley – Texas Station, Fiesta Rancho, and Fiesta Henderson – were closed in 2020 amid the COVID-19 pandemic and never reopened. Station announced in 2022 that it would demolish the properties and sell the land to finance future projects. The demolition was viewed by analysts as a defensive move to prevent future competition from gaming rivals. Station also announced in 2022 that it would close and demolish its Wild Wild West Gambling Hall & Hotel, located in the Las Vegas Valley as well. The site will be redeveloped in connection with adjoining acreage.

Wildfire Gaming is a division of Station that operates small casinos around the Las Vegas Valley. Wildfire-branded casinos are smaller than Station's other properties and lack hotel rooms. The original property, known simply as Wildfire Casino, opened in 2001. Station purchased the  casino in 2003, and opened additional Wildfire casinos starting in 2008. A  Wildfire was opened in downtown Las Vegas in 2023. It was built on five acres, occupying a portion of the former Castaways Hotel and Casino site, which Station had purchased in 2004. Compared to previous Wildfire casinos, the new location features a more upscale design which will be integrated into existing and future locations.

Current casinos

 Although not branded fully separately, Green Valley Ranch and Red Rock Resort are in a distinctly different upscale market niche from the other Station Casinos.

Former casinos

Development sites
All the Nevada sites below are gaming-entitled, unless otherwise noted. Gaming-entitled means that a casino can be built on that location without special approvals.

 Las Vegas area
Losee Station
 Flamingo Road – At Clark County 215 and Town Center Drive in Summerlin South.
 Durango – A casino resort with 211 rooms, located in the southwest Las Vegas Valley and scheduled to open in late 2023.
 Wild Wild West – At the intersection of Dean Martin Drive and West Tropicana Avenue in Paradise. Due to the special proximity of this site to the Las Vegas Strip, Station intends to build a tourist-oriented megaresort on this site.
 40 acres at Tule Springs
45 acres at Inspirada
A site at Skye Canyon
 126 acres at Cactus Avenue and Las Vegas Boulevard

Officers
 Station Casinos
 Frank Fertitta III, Chief Executive Officer and President

References

External links
 

 
1976 establishments in Nevada
2007 mergers and acquisitions
Companies based in Summerlin, Nevada
Companies that filed for Chapter 11 bankruptcy in 2009
Gambling companies of the United States
Hospitality companies of the United States
1993 initial public offerings